The following is the filmography of Prabhu. Besides Tamil he has also acted in Malayalam, Telugu and Kannada films.

1980s

1990s

2000s

2010s

2020s

References

External links
 Official website
 

Indian filmographies
Male actor filmographies